Evair Vieira de Melo (born April 2, 1972, Conceição do Castelo, Espírito Santo) is a Brazilian agricultural technician and federal deputy from the state of Espírito Santo.

He is a member of the Progressistas party (PP).

De Melo is a member of the Agricultural Committee of the Chamber of Deputies. He was the only deputy from Espírito Santo to participate at the commission for the impeachment of Dilma Rousseff.

In 2018 he was reelected with 48.412 votes.

He is an ally of Conservative president Jair Bolsonaro.

References

External links 

Living people
Members of the Chamber of Deputies (Brazil) from Espírito Santo
1972 births